Thomas Johansson (born 18 August 1970) is a retired Swedish ice hockey player. Johansson was part of the Djurgården Swedish champions' team of 2000. Johansson made 439 Elitserien appearances for Djurgården.

Personal life
Johansson's sons Simon and Anton are both professional ice hockey players. Anton was drafted in the fourth round, 105th overall, by the Detroit Red Wings in the 2022 NHL Entry Draft.

References

External links

1970 births
AIK IF players
Djurgårdens IF Hockey players
Jokerit players
Linköping HC players
Living people
Nacka HK players
Swedish ice hockey defencemen
Ice hockey people from Stockholm